These are articles listing games previously released for the original PlayStation that were later made available for download from the PlayStation Store for play on the PlayStation 3, PlayStation Portable, 
PlayStation Vita, PlayStation TV, PlayStation 4, or PlayStation 5. For lists of the games available by market, see:

List of downloadable PlayStation games (Japan)
List of downloadable PlayStation games (North America)
List of downloadable PlayStation games (PAL region)

1